Moradabad Airport is an upcoming airport in Moradabad, situated midway between Moradabad and Rampur on National Highway 9 in Uttar Pradesh. It is developing by upgrading the existing government airstrip. The Government of Uttar Pradesh signed a Memorandum of Understanding (MoU) with the Airports Authority of India (AAI) in February 2014 for the development of this airstrip .

The airport was constructed on 52 hectares land at an estimated cost of ₹ 21 crore. The contract was earlier awarded to RITES, but was cancelled and awarded to the Uttar Pradesh State Construction Corporation. The Ministry of Civil Aviation (MoCA) asked the State Government in November 2012 to hand over the airfield in Moradabad and an additional 300-350 acres land, free of cost, to the Airports Authority of India (AAI) in order to upgrade the airfield for commercial operations. The AAI had proposed to develop a taxi track, an apron, isolation bay, navigational aids, localiser, glide path, terminal building, Air Traffic Control (ATC) tower and hangars. The Uttar Pradesh cabinet approved to hand over the airstrip to AAI in September 2013.

As of June 2022, construction of the airport is completed, including the upgraded runway, a taxi track, the approach road and the passenger terminal. The airport is commence operations from 23 October 2022, with its first flight to Delhi, by operating a 19-seater aircraft.

References

Airports in Uttar Pradesh
Proposed airports in Uttar Pradesh
Moradabad
Airports with year of establishment missing